Mario Super Sluggers is a sports and adventure video game for the Wii developed by Namco Bandai Games and Now Production, and published by Nintendo. It is part of the Mario Sports series, and the sequel to Mario Superstar Baseball for the GameCube. Mario Super Sluggers was released in Japan on June 19, 2008 and in North America on August 25, 2008. It was not released in Europe or Australia.

The game received mixed to positive reviews, with praise for the large character roster, multiplayer and gameplay, but criticism for the controls and lack of online play, while the graphics received mixed reactions.

Game modes
Mario Super Sluggers features game modes that are similar to those of Mario Superstar Baseball.

Exhibition
The player can choose a captain and which eight players to have on a team. The number of innings can be chosen, and which field position the players are on. The player can choose which one of the nine stadiums to play on, as long as it is unlocked.

Challenge Mode
The player starts as Mario and must recruit all the characters. This is also where to unlock all characters and stadiums. The plot of this mode is that Bowser Jr. is taking over the ball parks. After defeating Bowser Jr., Bowser appears and the player must defeat him in his Castle.

The player can choose between five different captains: Mario and the unlockable captains Yoshi (Yoshi Park), Donkey Kong (DK Jungle), Wario (Wario City), and Princess Peach (Peach Ice Garden). The player may switch captains at any time during gameplay.

Minigames
Some minigames can only be played in day or night time. There are nine minigames in total. However, several of the minigames are unlockable. Some minigames only play with the Wii Remote with Nunchuk and the Wii Remote sideways.

Toy Field
Players try to hit baseballs to point spaces all around the field. The other players try to catch the ball. A player who catches a ball goes up to bat. At the end of the game, king medals are awarded for various achievements. The computer adds up the score and the player with the most points will win. Toy Field can be played with the Wii Remote with Nunchuk, or with the Wii Remote sideways.

Practice
Players learn to bat, pitch, fielding, special moves and base running, so they can be better.

Records
Shows MVPs of exhibition games, star players in challenge mode and high scores of the minigames. There are also videos, and when the game is completed, the records will show the Intro movie.

Gameplay

The gameplay of Mario Super Sluggers is similar to that of its predecessor; the main difference being the controls, with the Wii Remote adding immersion using a control scheme similar to the baseball sub-game in Wii Sports. There are three control methods available: Wii Remote by itself, Wii Remote and Nunchuk, and the Wii Remote held sideways. Along with different styles of game mechanics, an important feature in Mario Super Sluggers is chemistry between the nine characters on a team. Chemistry gives any team the opportunity to earn items, rob home-runs with a super jump and use a laser beam throw to catch any opponent in the base path. This advantage in chemistry will help any team increase their odds of winning and increase their understanding of the game.

Reception

Mario Super Sluggers received mixed to positive reviews. The lack of online play was a generally major factor in the reviews. GameRankings gave it a score of 69.72%, while Metacritic gave it 69 out of 100.

The game was nominated for the 2009 Nickelodeon Kids' Choice Awards for Favorite Video Game, in which it lost to Guitar Hero World Tour.

Promotion
As part of the North American marketing launch, Nintendo created a series of collectible online cards along with a website that served as a virtual collector's album. The site promises that the series will include a card for each of the 41 characters featured in Mario Super Sluggers.

The cards began appearing in banner ads on popular children websites on August 18, 2008, but have since begun to appear as embedded hyperlinks in other, less obvious locations. Mario Super Sluggers Cards have been found on other sites, such as YouTube.

When the Seattle Mariners played the New York Yankees on September 5, 2008, the game was promoted there at Safeco Field. The first 20,000 fans received special Mario Super Sluggers foam mitts. There were also two booths with the game demo, and Mario Super Sluggers Cards were also passed out there. Every inning, someone was randomly chosen to win a Wii system along with the game. Whenever a home run or a good play happened, the Safeco Field video screen showed a gameplay clip with Mario, Luigi, or Bowser. A Mario mascot also appeared before the game with the Mariners' mascot, the Moose, but left after the first inning. Nintendo of America's offices are based in the Seattle area, and was the majority owner of the Mariners at the time of the game's release (hence the promotion).

Notes

References

External links
Official Mario Super Sluggers website

2008 video games
Baseball video games
Mario sports games
Bandai Namco games
Video game sequels
Now Production games
Wii games
Video games developed in Japan
Wii games re-released on the Nintendo eShop
Multiplayer and single-player video games